is a Japanese idol, a member of the girl group Momoiro Clover Z. As of December 2012, she is currently voice acting in the Nippon Television series Akumu-chan as a personage from the dreams of Keiko Kitagawa's character.

She was born in Kanagawa Prefecture. Her signature color in the group Momoiro Clover Z is Yellow.

Discography

Singles
 2016: Ring the Bell /  (Kanako Momota & Shiori Tamai)
 2023:	
 2023: Another World

Video albums
 2017: Momotamai Marriage Live (Kanako Momota & Shiori Tamai)

Filmography

Movies
 2010:  (Shiori Tamai - Main Role)
 2011:	 (Support Role) 
 2012:  (In omnibus format, Tamai starred in )
 2012: SPOTLIGHT (2012)
 2012: NINIFUNI (Short movie)
 2014:	Akumu-Chan The Movie (voice of Dream Beast, Support Role)
 2015:  (Yukko, Main Role)
 2015: Dragon Ball Z: Resurrection 'F' (voice of Tenshi - as Momoiro Clover Z, Support Role) 
 2016:	 (In omnibus format, Tamai starred in "Happy Birthday")
 2016: Stranger ~Bakemono ga Jiken wo Abaku~ (Shiori Nishizaki, TV Asahi tv movie)
 2019:  (remake of The Bucket List, Support Role)
 2021:  (Julius Warner, Support Role)

Dramas
 2012:	NTV Akumu-chan (voice of Dream Beast, Support Role)
 2013:	NHK G Tenshi to Jump (Mina Kawazoe (Yellow Angel, Minha) - Support Role)
 2016:	NHK BS Premium   (Kiyoshi, Support Role)
 2017: Hulu  (Anmomo - Support Role)
 2018: NHK  (Kaori, Support Role)
 TBA:  (Hot Pants)

References

External links 
 Shiori Tamai's official Stardust profile
 Momoiro Clover Z profile
 Blogs
 Shiori Tamai's official Ameblo blog (2011–present)
 Shiori Tamai's official Gree blog (2010–2011)
 Shiori Tamai's posts at the Momoiro Clover official blog (2009–2010)
 Shiori Tamai's posts at the 3B School Girl blog (2008–2009)
 Shiori Tamai at Imatsubu (2010)
 

Momoiro Clover Z members
1995 births
Living people
Japanese idols
Japanese women pop singers
Japanese child actresses
People from Kanagawa Prefecture
Stardust Promotion artists
Musicians from Kanagawa Prefecture